For information on all Jacksonville State University sports, see Jacksonville State Gamecocks.

The Jacksonville State Gamecocks football program is the intercollegiate American football team for Jacksonville State University (JSU) located in the U.S. state of Alabama. The team competes in the NCAA Division I Football Bowl Subdivision (FBS) as a member of the Conference USA. Jacksonville State's first football team was fielded in 1904. The team plays its home games at the 24,000-seat Burgess–Snow Field at JSU Stadium in Jacksonville, Alabama.

Jacksonville State planned to leave the Ohio Valley Conference for the ASUN Conference in July 2021, with the team temporarily competing in the Western Athletic Conference (WAC)'s "ASUN–WAC Challenge" partnership league. However, a few months later on November 5, 2021, the school accepted an invitation to join Conference USA (C-USA) of the NCAA Division I Football Bowl Subdivision (FBS) beginning with the 2023 season.

History

Jacksonville State University's first football team, the Eagle Owls, was formed in the late 19th century.  During the first half century of play, Troy University and Samford University became their rivals.  Before the start of the 1947 season, not only did the team change their colors from blue and gold to red and white but the mascot changed to the Fighting Gamecocks.

Jacksonville State joined the NCAA in 1973, and played at the NCAA Division II level from 1973-1994. In 1995, the team moved up to the NCAA Division I Football Championship Subdivision (FCS) and competed in the Southland Conference from 1996-2002 before moving to the Ohio Valley Conference from 2003-2020. Jacksonville State University planned to leave the Ohio Valley Conference for the ASUN Conference in July 2021, with the team temporarily competing in the Western Athletic Conference (WAC)'s "ASUN–WAC Challenge" partnership league. However, a few months later on November 5, 2021, the school accepted an invitation to join FBS Conference USA (C-USA) beginning with the 2023 season.

Classifications
 NAIA (1966–1969)
 NAIA Division I (1970–1981)
 NCAA Division II (1973–1994)
 NCAA Division I FCS (1995–2022)
 NCAA Division I FBS (2023–)

Conference affiliations
 Independent (1904–1937)
 Alabama Intercollegiate Conference (1938–1949)
 Southern Intercollegiate Athletic Association (1938–1940)
 Independent (1950–1959)
 Alabama Collegiate Conference (1960–1969)
 Mid-South Athletic Conference (1970–1971)
 Gulf South Conference (1972–1992)
 Division II Independent (1993–1995)
 Southland Conference (1996–2002)
 Ohio Valley Conference (2003–2020)
 ASUN–WAC Challenge (2021)
 ASUN Conference (2022)
 Conference USA (2023 and beyond)

Championships

National championships 
Jacksonville State has made four appearances in the NCAA Division II National Championship Game. The Gamecocks were defeated in their first three championship game appearances, losing 33–0 to Lehigh in 1977, 3–0 to Mississippi College in 1989 (later vacated), and 23–6 to Pittsburg State in 1991. The next year, the Gamecocks defeated Pittsburg State 17–13 in 1992, reversing the results in a rematch of their 1991 championship game.

Conference championships
Jacksonville State has won 25 conference championships, 18 outright and four shared.

† Co-championship

Playoff History

Division I-AA/FCS Playoffs results
The Gamecocks have appeared in the I-AA/FCS playoffs ten times with an overall record of 7–10.

Division II Playoffs results
The Gamecocks have appeared in the Division II playoffs ten times with an overall record of 15–9. They were National Champions in 1992.

Rivalries

Samford

This unnamed rivalry started in 1904 back when Jacksonville wore blue and gold as the Eagle Owls and Samford University was still named Howard College. Jacksonville State leads the series 23–21–2.

Troy

Jacksonville State used to play Troy in the annual Battle for the Ol' School Bell. The schools first played in 1924 and was one of the fiercest rivalries for both schools.  The game hasn't been played since 2001 after Troy moved up to the FBS. Jacksonville State leads the series 32–29–2.

Notable former players
Notable alumni include:
 Orlando Adams (drafted by Philadelphia Eagles)
 Jesse Baker (drafted by Houston Oilers)
 Alan Bonner (drafted by Houston Texans)
 A.J. Davis (signed by New Orleans Saints)
 Eric Davis (drafted by San Francisco 49ers)
 Jaylen Hill (signed by Baltimore Ravens)
 Peter Little Horn (signed by Detroit Lions)
 David Gulledge (drafted by Washington Redskins)
 Darrell Malone (drafted by Kansas City Chiefs)
 Keith McKeller (drafted by Buffalo Bills)
 Ryan Perrilloux (signed by New York Giants)
 Taureen Rhetta (signed by Kansas City Chiefs)
 David Robinson (drafted by Kansas City Chiefs)
 James Shaw (signed by Pittsburgh Steelers)
 Mike Wallace (drafted by Cleveland Browns)
 Pierre Warren (signed by New Orleans Saints)
 Alvin Wright (signed by Los Angeles Rams)
 Dieter Brock (signed by Los Angeles Rams)
 Troymaine Pope (signed by Seattle Seahawks)
 Chris Landrum (signed by San Diego Chargers)
 Siran Neal (drafted by Buffalo Bills)
 Roc Thomas (signed by Minnesota Vikings)
 Casey Dunn (signed by Washington Redskins)
 Mark Word (signed by Cleveland Browns)
 Delvin Hughley (signed by Denver Broncos)
 Riley Green (country music singer, played quarterback)

Future non-conference opponents 
Future non-conference opponents announced as of February 15, 2023.

References

External links
 

 
American football teams established in 1904
1904 establishments in Alabama